Guty may refer to the following villages:
Guty (Třinec) in the Czech Republic
Guty, Legionowo County in Masovian Voivodeship (east-central Poland)
Guty, Podlaskie Voivodeship (north-east Poland)
Guty, Sokołów County in Masovian Voivodeship (east-central Poland)
Guty, Giżycko County in Warmian-Masurian Voivodeship (north Poland)
Guty, Olecko County in Warmian-Masurian Voivodeship (north Poland)